2009–10 Bosnia and Herzegovina Football Cup was the fifteenth season of Bosnia and Herzegovina's annual football cup, and a tenth season of the unified competition.  The competition started on 8 September 2009 with the First Round and concluded on 19 May 2010 with the Final.

First round
Thirty-two teams entered in the First Round. The matches were played on 8–23 September 2009.

|}

Second round
The 16 winners from the prior round enter this round. The first legs were played on 29 and 30 September and the second legs were played on 21 and 22 October 2009.

|}

Quarterfinals
The eight winners from the prior round enter this round. The first legs were played on 28 October and the second legs were played on 11 November 2009.

|}

Semifinals
The four winners from the prior round enter this round. The first legs will be played on 23 and 24 March and the second legs were played on 14 April 2010.

|}

Final

First leg

Second leg

Željezničar 3–3 Borac on aggregate.  Borac won on away goals.

External links
 Official site 

Bosnia and Herzegovina Football Cup seasons
Cup
Bosnia